Martin Brambach (born 28 October 1967, in Dresden) is a German actor. He grew up in Dresden, East Berlin and Hamburg. After attending Westfälische Schauspielschule drama school in Bochum, Brambach was engaged at Schauspielhaus Bochum, Schauspiel Köln, Burgtheater Vienna (company member from 1989 to 1999) and Schaubühne Berlin.

He appeared in more than one hundred films since 1988. He played minor roles in the Academy Award-winning films The Lives of Others, The Counterfeiters and The Reader, and worked with internationally known directors like Michael Haneke and Thomas Vinterberg.

Brambach lives in Recklinghausen with actress Christine Sommer, her daughters and their son. He is the half brother of Jan Josef Liefers.

Filmography 

1993: Das Geheimnis .... Walter Rosner
1997: Comedian Harmonists
1999: Kubanisch rauchen .... Polizist
1999: Untersuchung an Mädeln
2002: Sophiiiie! .... Mann mit Toupet
2003: Ravioli .... Grocer
2003: Anatomie 2 .... Vorstopper
2003: Good Bye, Lenin .... Stasi 1
2003: Struggle .... Martin
2003: Adam & Eva .... Erik
2003: Böse Zellen .... Reini, Manu's brother
2003: MA 2412 - Die Staatsdiener
2004: Die Boxerin .... Igor
2005:  .... Kähler
2006: Goldene Zeiten .... Hotelmanager
2006: Klimt .... Thomas
2006: The Lives of Others .... Einsatzleiter Meyer
2006: Where Is Fred? .... Johansen
2007:  .... Scharrer (segment "Artikel 11")
2007: The Counterfeiters .... Hauptscharführer Holst
2007: Yella .... Dr. Fritz
2008:  .... Gewehrverkäufer
2008:  .... Gauredner
2008: North Face .... Redakteur Henze
2008: The Reader .... Remand Prison Guard #1
2009: Barfuß bis zum Hals .... Helmut Steiner
2009: Diamantenhochzeit .... Manfred
2009:  .... Journalist
2010: Tag und Nacht (Day and Night) .... Kai
2011: Avé .... Truck-driver
2011: 4 Days in May .... Oberleutnant Wendt
2012: A Coffee In Berlin .... Kontrolleur Jörg
2012: Unter Frauen .... Cornelius Berger
2013: Harms .... Timm
2013: Der fast perfekte Mann .... Henssler
2014:  .... Herr Hiller jr.
2014: Bhopal: A Prayer for Rain .... Ted
2016: Frauen .... Rüdiger Kneppke
2018: Kursk .... Captain Gennady Shirokov (Kursk)
2018: 25 km/h
2020: Lindenberg! Mach dein Ding .... Herm

Television
1988: Mother Courage and Her Children (TV Movie) .... Schweizerkas
1997: The Castle (TV Movie) .... Schwarzer
2004–2006: SOKO Wismar (TV Series) .... Kriminaloberkommissar Winfried 'Winnie' Scheel
2007–2010: KDD – Berlin Crime Squad .... Thomas Behrens
2012–2014: Add a Friend .... Dr. Metzler
1999–2020: Tatort .... Kommissariatsleiter Peter Michael Schnabe
2017: Schuld nach Ferdinand von Schirach (Guilt)

References

External links 
 

1967 births
Living people
Actors from Dresden
German male film actors
German male television actors